Heck are a British rock band formed in Nottingham, England, in 2009 under the name Baby Godzilla. The name was changed after a lawsuit from the Japanese film company, Toho, which owns the copyright to the name Godzilla. The band split up in August 2017, announcing a final show scheduled for 17 August. 

On 5th July 2022 the bands social media channels were updated and a performance announced at 2000 Trees Festival on 8th July 2022.

Musical style
Heck's musical style has been described as mathcore, punk thrash, thrash metal, punk rock heavy metal, thrashcore, hardcore punk, progressive metal, punk metal, stadium rock, groove metal and borderline grindcore. It has been compared to Iggy Pop, Napalm Death, The Dillinger Escape Plan, Future of the Left, Gallows, Pulled Apart by Horses and The Chariot.

Members

Final line-up
Jonny Hall – vocals, rhythm guitar (2011–2017, 2022)
Matt Reynolds – vocals, lead guitar (2009–2017, 2022)
Paul Shelley – backing vocals, bass guitar (2009–2017, 2022)
Tom Marsh – drums (2009–2017, 2022)

Past members
Joe Rawson – vocals, rhythm guitar (2009–2011)

Discography

Music videos

References

British post-hardcore musical groups
Musical groups established in 2009
English progressive metal musical groups
Musical groups from Nottingham